Mashynobudivnyk Stadium is a football stadium in Karlivka, Ukraine.

References

External links
 Stadium's basic info
 Stadium's basic info

Football venues in Poltava Oblast
Sports venues in Poltava Oblast
FC Karlivka